Michael James Cuccione (January 5, 1985 – January 13, 2001) was a Canadian child actor, singer, dancer, author, and cancer research activist. He was best known for his role as "Q.T." in the fictional boy band 2gether.

Biography

Personal life
Cuccione was born in Burnaby, British Columbia, and raised in neighbouring Coquitlam.

Entertainment career
In July 1997, a request Cuccione made to meet Baywatch star David Hasselhoff led to a role in an episode on the show as real-life cancer patient Charlie Everett Dodson Hays.

The producers of 2ge+her had already agreed to shoot the movie (and later the series) in Vancouver when they discovered Cuccione and cast him in the part of Jason "QT" McKnight. The series was an immediate hit, as was the subsequent soundtrack from the show. The spoof boy band became so popular with fans and artists that they went on tour and opened for Britney Spears. Both soundtracks hit the Billboard Top 100. The 2ge+her movie was released on February 21, 2000, and the series soon followed on August 15 of that same year, on MTV's 10 Spot.

Illness and advocacy
In 1994, when Cuccione was 9, he was diagnosed with stage 2A Hodgkin's lymphoma, a form of cancer affecting the lymph nodes. It was treated with five months of chemotherapy, but returned the following year. His second bout with the disease metastasized to his lungs. He required massive doses of chemotherapy, a bone marrow transplant, and twelve radiation treatments around his heart and lungs. He was then cancer free, but the treatment left him with permanent lung and respiratory problems.

Cuccione became a well-known campaigner for cancer research and awareness. The singer/actor established The Michael Cuccione Foundation for Cancer Research and turned his love for music into a fundraising effort by recording a five-song CD, Make a Difference. He also co-authored a book with his grandmother titled, There are Survivors: The Michael Cuccione Story about his experiences battling cancer; his effort eventually raised C$500,000, which was donated to the British Columbia's Children's Hospital. Cuccione made many in-person appearances on television, radio, at schools and hospitals, and other fundraising events.

Death
As the second season of 2ge+her started taping, Cuccione soon began suffering breathing problems from complications from his earlier cancer treatments and required an oxygen tank on-set. His problems increased, and soon he had to miss several tapings of the show and public group appearances. In December 2000, Cuccione was unable to fight off the effects of a minor car accident and entered the hospital on December 4, 2000, with pneumonia. He spent the rest of his stay on a ventilator and celebrated his last Christmas, New Year's, and birthday in the hospital before succumbing to respiratory failure on January 13, 2001, eight days after his 16th birthday.

Funeral
Thousands packed the church in Vancouver, British Columbia on the Wednesday evening of January 17, 2001, and again on the next morning to mourn. All four of Cuccione's 2ge+her band/cast members were in attendance for both services. Also in attendance was David Hasselhoff, who gave the eulogy and dedicated a song at the Wednesday services. Both services included a 75-member choir from Cuccione's high school, Notre Dame Regional Secondary School. Among the items displayed were pictures of Cuccione being blessed by Pope John Paul II, a giant poster of Cuccione with a teddy bear, and a massive set of wreaths and flowers. During the Thursday services, a huge procession of limousines, cars, and firetrucks accompanied Cuccione's casket through the streets of Greater Vancouver. He was buried at Ocean View Burial Park in Burnaby, Greater Vancouver Regional District, British Columbia, Canada.

Acting credits
Baywatch (1997) as Charlie Everett Hays
"You, Me and the Kids" (1998-2001)
2ge+her the movie (February 2000) as Jason "QT" McKnight
2ge+her the series (August 2000) as Jason "QT" McKnight
Making the Video (August 2000) as Jason "QT" McKnight

Recording credits
Make a Difference
2ge+her movie soundtrack
2ge+her: Again series soundtrack
Messages from Above

References

External links
The Michael Cuccione Foundation

Michael Cuccione At Find A Grave

1985 births
2001 deaths
20th-century Canadian male singers
Canadian male child actors
Canadian people of Italian descent
People from Burnaby
People from Coquitlam
Deaths from cancer in British Columbia
Male actors from British Columbia
2gether (band) members